Mayoori (1983–2005), credited as  Shalini in Tamil films, was an Indian actress who appeared in Malayalam, Tamil and Kannada films from 1998 to 2005. She did major roles in films such as Summer in Bethlehem, Aakasha Ganga, Prem Poojari and Sarvabhouma.

She committed suicide in 2005 at the age of 22.

Filmography

Television
Ilayaval Gayathri (photo only)
 Kadamattathu Kathanar as Kalyani
 Salanam  as Sandhya
 Sthree as Malini

References

External links
 

Actresses in Tamil cinema
Actresses in Kannada cinema
Actresses in Malayalam cinema
Indian film actresses
21st-century Indian actresses
Suicides by hanging in India
2005 deaths
1983 births
Actresses from Kolkata
Indian television actresses
Actresses in Tamil television
Actresses in Malayalam television
2005 suicides
Actresses in Telugu cinema
Artists who committed suicide